Lord Buckethead is a satirical political candidate who has stood in four British general elections since 1987, portrayed by several individuals. He poses as an intergalactic villain similar to the Star Wars character Darth Vader.

Lord Buckethead was created by the American filmmaker Todd Durham for his 1984 science fiction film Hyperspace. Without authorisation, the British video distributor Mike Lee adopted Lord Buckethead to stand in the 1987 UK general election and again in the 1992 general election. The character went unused until the comedian Jonathan Harvey stood as Lord Buckethead in the 2017 general election; his televised appearance standing next to prime minister Theresa May went viral, drawing media coverage and an online following.

After the 2017 election, Durham asserted his ownership of Lord Buckethead and displaced Harvey. With Durham's authorisation, Lord Buckethead returned in 2019, now played by David Hughes. He appeared at People's Vote rallies calling for a second Brexit referendum, and stood in the 2019 general election representing the Monster Raving Loony Party. Harvey continued to campaign using his own character, Count Binface.

History

1980s origins 
Lord Buckethead was created by the American filmmaker Todd Durham for his 1984 film Hyperspace, a low-budget parody of science fiction films such as Star Wars. In the film, Lord Buckethead, a galactic villain similar to Star Wars character Darth Vader, was played by Robert Bloodworth.

In the UK, Hyperspace was released as Gremloids by the video distributor VIPCO, owned by Mike Lee. In the 1987 UK general election, Lee stood as Lord Buckethead, representing the Gremloids Party, against Conservative prime minister Margaret Thatcher in her constituency in Finchley, London. He campaigned to demolish Birmingham to make way for a spaceport. He received 131 votes. In the 1992 general election, he stood against Conservative prime minister John Major in Huntingdon, winning 107 votes (0.1%).

2017 return 
In 2017, comedian Jonathan Harvey stood as Lord Buckethead against Theresa May in Maidenhead in the 2017 general election. Harvey decided to use Lord Buckethead after watching Gremloids and discovering that the character had been used in earlier elections. He received 249 (0.4%) votes, the highest yet for the character.

Lord Buckethead's televised appearance standing next to May went viral. In a tongue-in-cheek article, The Guardian gave Lord Buckethead a "Best Policy" award for a manifesto pledge to bring back Ceefax. A few days after the election, Lord Buckethead appeared on the American talk show Last Week Tonight with John Oliver, campaigning to lead the Brexit negotiations. Harvey created a Twitter account for the character, drawing hundreds of thousands of followers. The Guardian wrote that Lord Buckethead was part of a British tradition of frivolous political candidates, many of whom were supported by the Official Monster Raving Loony Party.

Lord Buckethead made a surprise appearance at Glastonbury Festival in June 2017, introducing the band Sleaford Mods. That year, he released a Christmas single, "A Bucketful of Happiness", accompanied by a music video.

Copyright dispute 
After the 2017 election, Durham contacted Harvey and asserted his ownership of the Lord Buckethead character. According to Harvey, Durham instructed him to give him the password to the Twitter account; Harvey acquiesced as he could not afford a legal challenge. Durham said he welcomed authorised applications to stand as the character in future British elections: "My Lord Buckethead character has always been the voice of the people, so my feeling is to let the people be his voice."

The Twitter account became active again in 2019. That year, Lord Buckethead, now played by David Hughes, appeared at People's Vote rallies calling for a second Brexit referendum. In April, Buckethead crowdfunded £15,000 to stand against Nigel Farage for South East England MEP in the May 2019 European Parliament Elections. The bid was abandoned for fear it could take votes away from parties campaigning for the UK to remain in the EU. Durham said the money was returned.

For the general election in December 2019, Buckethead represented the Official Monster Raving Loony Party, standing against prime minister Boris Johnson in his constituency of Uxbridge and South Ruislip. Harvey also stood in that constituency, using a new character, Count Binface.

Platform

Lord Buckethead's manifesto in the 2017 election promised "strong, not entirely stable leadership", a reference to the Conservatives' slogan "strong and stable". The following promises were included:
The abolition of the House of Lords, with the exception of Lord Buckethead
Nuclear weapons: "A firm public commitment to build the 100-billion-pound renewal of Britain's Trident weapons system, followed by an equally firm commitment, privately, not to build it. They're secret submarines, so no one will ever know. It's a win-win." 
Free bicycles for all to "combat obesity, traffic congestion, and bike theft". 
Reducing the voting age to 16 and restricting voting beyond the age of 80
Instead of Theresa May's commitment to bring back grammar schools, Buckethead would build "gamma" schools founded on three principles: "One, better funding for teachers, to attract bright graduates. Two, increased facilities for children, especially playing fields. Three, if any child misbehaves three times, they are blasted into deep space, with the parents provided with a lovely fruit basket, by way of consolation or celebration, depending on the child. Discipline is key".
A referendum on whether or not to have another Brexit referendum.
Legalise the hunting of fox hunters
Nationalise pop singer Adele
Exile of right-wing columnist Katie Hopkins to the "Phantom Zone".
Regeneration of Nicholson's Shopping Centre, Maidenhead.
The cessation of arms sales to Saudi Arabia so that Britain can purchase laser weaponry from Lord Buckethead.

Electoral history

See also

List of frivolous political parties

References

External links

Lord Buckethead with John Major, 1992

Anonymity pseudonyms
English politicians
British political candidates
Film characters introduced in 1984
Fictional characters from parallel universes
Fictional lords and ladies
Science fiction film characters
British political satire